The Gonfalonier (in Italian: Gonfaloniere) was the holder of a highly prestigious communal office in medieval and Renaissance Italy, notably in Florence and the Papal States. The name derives from gonfalone (in English, gonfalon), the term used for the banners of such communes.

The title originated from Florence in the 1250s, the holders were known as the head of the militia. A similar office. known as Gonfalonier of Justice (Gonfaloniere di Giustizia) was made to protect the interests of the people. They became part of the city's government, or Signoria.

Other central and northern Italian communes, from Spoleto to the County of Savoy, elected or appointed gonfalonieri.  The Bentivoglio family of Bologna aspired to this office during the sixteenth century.  However, by the year 1622, when Artemisia Gentileschi painted a portrait of Pietro Gentile as a gonfaloniere of Bologna, with the gonfalone in the background, the office had merely symbolic value.

See also
Capitano del popolo
Condottieri
Gonfalonier of the Church
Podestà

References

External links
Portrait of Pietro Gentile as a gonfaloniere of Bologna by Artemisia Gentileschi, 1622.

Heraldry

Italian Renaissance
Positions of authority
Political titles